Joe Amato (born May 31, 1955, in Syracuse, New York, and raised in the metro area) is an American writer best known for his poetry and his work in poetics.

Biography

A licensed Professional Engineer in New York State, Amato spent seven years in industry working in various project engineering capacities before returning to graduate school. He holds degrees in mathematics and mechanical engineering from Syracuse University (B.S./B.S., 1976), and degrees in English from University at Albany (M.A., 1986, Doctor of Arts, 1989). Amato is the author of eleven books, including a memoir and three novels, and numerous essays and reviews. With his frequent writing partner, Kass Fleisher, he wrote several screenplays (none of which have been produced to date). From 2003 to 2023, Amato was a member of the creative writing faculty at Illinois State University in Normal, Illinois. He's the former production manager at Steerage Press.

Books 
Symptoms of a Finer Age(Viet Nam Generation and Burning Cities Press, 1994)
Bookend: Anatomies of a Virtual Self (SUNY Press, 1997)
Finger Exorcised (BlazeVOX Books, 2006)
Under Virga (Chax Press, 2006)
Industrial Poetics: Demo Tracks for a Mobile Culture (University of Iowa Press, 2006)
Pain Plus Thyme (Factory School, 2008)
Once an Engineer: A Song of the Salt City (SUNY Press, 2009)
Big Man with a Shovel (Steerage Press, 2011)
Samuel Taylor's Last Night (Dalkey Archive Press, 2014)
Sipping Coffee @ Carmela's (Lit Fest Press, 2016)
Samuel Taylor's Hollywood Adventure (Bordighera Press, 2018)

External links 
Official site of Joe Amato

Poets from New York (state)
American memoirists
20th-century American novelists
20th-century American male writers
Syracuse University alumni
1955 births
Living people
Illinois State University faculty
Writers from Syracuse, New York
21st-century American novelists
20th-century American poets
21st-century American poets
American male novelists
American male poets
21st-century American male writers
Novelists from New York (state)
Novelists from Illinois
20th-century American non-fiction writers
21st-century American non-fiction writers
American male non-fiction writers